Blues in the Closet is a 1983 album by jazz pianist Tommy Flanagan, bassist Ron Carter and drummer Tony Williams, known collectively as The Master Trio.

Background 
Pianist Tommy Flanagan and bassist Ron Carter had recorded together numerous times since 1960. In contrast, this recording session (which also resulted in the album The Master Trio) was Flanagan's only recording with drummer Tony Williams.

Recording and music 
The album was recorded on June 16 and 17, 1983, at A&R Recording Studio in New York City. The material includes blues, ballads, and bebop compositions. "Sister Cheryl" is a Williams composition.

Release 
The album was released in Japan by Baybridge.

Track listing 
"Good Bait" (Tadd Dameron, Count Basie)
"Afternoon in Paris" (John Lewis)
"Giant Steps" (John Coltrane)
"Blues in the Closet" (Oscar Pettiford)
"Sister Cheryl" (Tony Williams)
"My Ship" (Kurt Weill, Ira Gershwin)
"Moose the Mooche" (Charlie Parker)

Personnel 
 Tommy Flanagan – piano
 Ron Carter – bass
 Tony Williams – drums

References 

1984 albums
Tommy Flanagan albums